El Cedro may refer to:
El Cedro, Herrera
El Cedro, Los Santos